Hilarographa robinsoni is a species of moth of the family Tortricidae. It is found in Brunei.

The wingspan is about 19 mm. The ground colour of the forewings is dull orange cream with some greyish and brown lines. The basal area is dark brown. The hindwings are brown, but more cream in the median and basal parts.

Etymology
The species is named in honour of Dr. Gaden S. Robinson, who collected the species.

References

Moths described in 2009
Hilarographini